The Tenerife airport disaster occurred on March 27, 1977, when two Boeing 747 passenger jets collided on the runway at Los Rodeos Airport  (now Tenerife North Airport) on the Spanish island of Tenerife. The collision occurred when KLM Flight 4805 initiated its takeoff run while Pan Am Flight 1736 was still on the runway. The impact and resulting fire killed everyone on board KLM 4805 and most of the occupants of Pan Am 1736, with only 61 survivors in the front section of the aircraft. With 583 fatalities, the disaster is the deadliest accident in aviation history.

A bomb set off by the Canary Islands Independence Movement at Gran Canaria Airport had caused many flights to be diverted to Los Rodeos, including the two aircraft involved in the accident. The airport quickly became congested with parked airplanes blocking the only taxiway and forcing departing aircraft to taxi on the runway instead. Patches of thick fog were drifting across the airfield, so visibility was greatly reduced for pilots and the control tower.

The subsequent investigation by Spanish authorities concluded that the primary cause of the accident was the KLM captain's decision to take off in the mistaken belief that a takeoff clearance from air traffic control (ATC) had been issued. Dutch investigators placed a greater emphasis on a mutual misunderstanding in radio communications between the KLM crew and ATC, but ultimately KLM admitted that their crew was responsible for the accident and the airline agreed to financially compensate the relatives of all of the victims.

The disaster had a lasting influence on the industry, highlighting in particular the vital importance of using standardized phraseology in radio communications. Cockpit procedures were also reviewed, contributing to the establishment of crew resource management as a fundamental part of airline pilots' training. The captain is no longer considered infallible, and combined crew input is encouraged during aircraft operations.

Flight history 
Tenerife was an unscheduled stop for both flights. Their destination was Gran Canaria Airport (also known as Las Palmas Airport or Gando Airport), serving Las Palmas on the nearby island of Gran Canaria. Both islands are part of the Canary Islands, an autonomous community of Spain located in the Atlantic Ocean off the southwest coast of Morocco.

KLM Flight 4805 

KLM Flight 4805 was a charter flight for Holland International Travel Group and had arrived from Amsterdam Airport Schiphol, Netherlands. Its cockpit crew consisted of Captain Jacob Veldhuyzen van Zanten (age 50), First Officer Klaas Meurs (42), and Flight  Engineer Willem Schreuder (48). At the time of the accident, Veldhuyzen van Zanten was KLM's chief flight instructor, with 11,700 flight hours, of which 1,545 hours were on the 747. Meurs had 9,200 flight hours, of which 95 hours were on the 747. Schreuder had 17,031 flight hours, of which 543 hours were on the 747.

The aircraft was a Boeing 747-206B, registration PH-BUF, named Rijn (Rhine). The KLM jet was carrying 14 crew members and 235 passengers, including 52 children. Most of the KLM passengers were Dutch; also on board were four Germans, two Austrians and two Americans. After the aircraft landed at Tenerife, the passengers were transported to the airport terminal. One of the inbound passengers, Robina van Lanschot, who lived on the island with her boyfriend, chose not to re-board the 747, leaving 234 passengers on board.

Pan Am Flight 1736 
Pan Am Flight 1736 had originated at Los Angeles International Airport, with an intermediate stop at New York's John F. Kennedy International Airport (JFK). The aircraft was a Boeing 747-121, registration N736PA, named Clipper Victor. It was the first 747 to be delivered to an airline. Of the 380 passengers (mostly of retirement age, but including two children), 14 had boarded in New York, where the crew was also changed. All but five passengers onboard the aircraft were Americans; the non-American passengers were all Canadian nationals. The new crew consisted of Captain Victor Grubbs (age 56), First Officer Robert Bragg (39), Flight Engineer George Warns (46) and 13 flight attendants. At the time of the accident, Grubbs had 21,043 hours of flight time, of which 564 hours were on the 747. Bragg had 10,800 flight hours, of which 2,796 hours were on the 747. Warns had 15,210 flight hours, of which 559 hours were on the 747.

This particular aircraft had operated the inaugural 747 commercial flight on January 22, 1970. On 2 August 1970, in its first year of service, it also became the first 747 to be hijacked: en route between JFK and Luis Muñoz Marín International Airport in San Juan, Puerto Rico, it was diverted to José Martí International Airport in Havana, Cuba.

Incident

Diversion of aircraft to Los Rodeos

Both flights had been routine until they approached the islands. At 13:15, a bomb planted by the separatist Canary Islands Independence Movement exploded in the terminal of Gran Canaria Airport, injuring eight people. There had been a phone call warning of the bomb, and another call received soon afterwards made claims of a second bomb at the airport. The civil aviation authorities had therefore closed the airport temporarily after the explosion, and all incoming flights bound for Gran Canaria had been diverted to Los Rodeos, including the two aircraft involved in the disaster. The Pan Am crew indicated that they would prefer to circle in a holding pattern until landing clearance was given (they had enough fuel to safely stay in the air for two more hours), but they were ordered to divert to Tenerife.

Los Rodeos was a regional airport that could not easily accommodate all of the traffic diverted from Gran Canaria, which included five large airliners. The airport had only one runway and one major taxiway running parallel to it, with four short taxiways connecting the two. While waiting for Gran Canaria airport to reopen, the diverted airplanes took up so much space that they had to park on the long taxiway, making it unavailable for the purpose of taxiing. Instead, departing aircraft needed to taxi along the runway to position themselves for takeoff, a procedure known as a backtaxi or backtrack.

The authorities reopened Gran Canaria airport once the bomb threat had been contained. The Pan Am plane was ready to depart from Tenerife, but access to the runway was obstructed by the KLM plane and a refueling vehicle; the KLM captain had decided to fully refuel at Los Rodeos instead of Las Palmas, apparently to save time. The Pan Am aircraft was unable to maneuver around the refueling KLM in order to reach the runway for takeoff, due to a lack of safe clearance between the two planes, which was just . The refueling took about 35 minutes, after which the passengers were brought back to the aircraft. The search for a missing Dutch family of four, who had not returned to the waiting KLM plane, delayed the flight even further. Robina van Lanschot, a tour guide, had chosen not to reboard for the flight to Las Palmas, because she lived on Tenerife and thought it impractical to fly to Gran Canaria only to return to Tenerife the next day. She was therefore not on the KLM plane when the accident happened, and would be the only survivor of those who flew from Amsterdam to Tenerife on Flight 4805.

Taxiing and takeoff preparations 
The tower instructed the KLM plane to taxi down the entire length of the runway and then make a 180° turn to get into takeoff position. While the KLM was backtaxiing on the runway, the controller asked the flight crew to report when it was ready to copy the ATC clearance. Because the flight crew was performing the checklist, copying the clearance was postponed until the aircraft was in takeoff position.

Shortly afterward, the Pan Am was instructed to follow the KLM down the same runway, exit it by taking the third exit on their left and then use the parallel taxiway. Initially, the crew was unclear as to whether the controller had told them to take the first or third exit. The crew asked for clarification and the controller responded emphatically by replying: "The third one, sir; one, two, three; third, third one." The crew began the taxi and proceeded to identify the unmarked taxiways using an airport diagram as they reached them.

The crew successfully identified the first two taxiways (C-1 and C-2), but their discussion in the cockpit indicated that they had not sighted the third taxiway (C-3), which they had been instructed to use. There were no markings or signs to identify the runway exits and they were in conditions of poor visibility. The Pan Am crew appeared to remain unsure of their position on the runway until the collision, which occurred near the intersection with the fourth taxiway (C-4).

The angle of the third taxiway would have required the plane to perform a 148° turn, which would lead back toward the still-crowded main apron. At the end of C-3, the Pan Am would have to make another 148° turn, in order to continue taxiing towards the start of the runway, similar to a mirrored letter "Z". Taxiway C-4 would have required two 35° turns. A study carried out by the Air Line Pilots Association (ALPA) after the accident concluded that making the second 148° turn at the end of taxiway C-3 would have been "a practical impossibility". The official report from the Spanish authorities explained that the controller instructed the Pan Am aircraft to use the third taxiway because this was the earliest exit that they could take to reach the unobstructed section of the parallel taxiway.

Weather conditions at Los Rodeos 
Drifting clouds of different densities cause wildly varying visibilities, from unhindered at one moment to below the legal minimum the next. The collision took place in a high-density cloud.

The Pan Am crew found themselves in poor and rapidly deteriorating visibility almost as soon as they entered the runway.

Meanwhile, the KLM plane was still in good visibility, but with clouds blowing down the runway towards them. The aircraft completed its 180-degree turn in relatively clear weather and lined up on Runway 30.

Communication misunderstandings 

Immediately after lining up, the KLM captain advanced the throttles and the aircraft started to move forward. First officer Meurs advised him that ATC clearance had not yet been given, and captain Veldhuyzen van Zanten responded: "No, I know that. Go ahead, ask." Meurs then radioed the tower that they were "ready for takeoff" and "waiting for our ATC clearance". The KLM crew then received instructions that specified the route that the aircraft was to follow after takeoff. The instructions used the word "takeoff," but did not include an explicit statement that they were cleared for takeoff.

Meurs read the flight clearance back to the controller, completing the readback with the statement: "We are now at takeoff." Captain Veldhuyzen van Zanten interrupted the co-pilot's readback with the comment, "We're going."

The controller, who could not see the runway due to the fog, initially responded with "OK" (terminology that is nonstandard), which reinforced the KLM captain's misinterpretation that they had takeoff clearance. The controller's response of "OK" to the co-pilot's nonstandard statement that they were "now at takeoff" was likely due to his misinterpretation that they were in takeoff position and ready to begin the roll when takeoff clearance was received, but not in the process of taking off. The controller then immediately added "stand by for takeoff, I will call you", indicating that he had not intended the instruction to be interpreted as a takeoff clearance.

A simultaneous radio call from the Pan Am crew caused mutual interference on the radio frequency, which was audible in the KLM cockpit as a three-second-long shrill sound (or heterodyne). This caused the KLM crew to miss the crucial latter portion of the tower's response. The Pan Am crew's transmission was "We're still taxiing down the runway, the Clipper 1736!" This message was also blocked by the interference and inaudible to the KLM crew. Either message, if heard in the KLM cockpit, would have alerted the crew to the situation and given them time to abort the takeoff attempt.

Due to the fog, neither crew was able to see the other plane on the runway ahead of them. In addition, neither of the aircraft could be seen from the control tower, and the airport was not equipped with ground radar.

After the KLM plane had started its takeoff roll, the tower instructed the Pan Am crew to "report when runway clear." The Pan Am crew replied: "OK, will report when we're clear." On hearing this, the KLM flight engineer expressed his concern about the Pan Am not being clear of the runway by asking the pilots in his own cockpit, "Is he not clear that Pan American?" Veldhuyzen van Zanten emphatically replied "Oh, yes" and continued with the takeoff.

Collision 
According to the cockpit voice recorder (CVR), the Pan Am captain said, "There he is!" when he spotted the KLM's landing lights through the fog just as his plane approached exit C-4. When it became clear that the KLM aircraft was approaching at takeoff speed, Captain Grubbs exclaimed, "Goddamn, that son-of-a-bitch is coming!", while first officer Robert Bragg yelled, "Get off! Get off! Get off!" Captain Grubbs applied full power to the throttles and made a sharp left turn towards the grass in an attempt to avoid the impending collision. 

By the time the KLM pilots saw the Pan Am aircraft, they were already moving too fast to stop. In desperation, the pilots prematurely rotated the aircraft nose upward and attempted to clear the Pan Am by lifting off, causing a  tailstrike. The KLM 747 was within  of the Pan Am and moving at approximately  when it left the ground. Its nose landing gear cleared the Pan Am, but its left-side engines, lower fuselage, and main landing gear struck the upper right side of the Pan Am's fuselage, ripping apart the center of the Pan Am jet almost directly above the wing. The right-side engines crashed through the Pan Am's upper deck immediately behind the cockpit.

The KLM plane remained briefly airborne, but the impact had sheared off the outer left engine, caused significant amounts of shredded materials to be ingested by the inner left engine, and damaged the wings. The plane immediately went into a stall, rolled sharply, and hit the ground approximately  past the collision, sliding down the runway for a further . The full load of fuel, which had caused the earlier delay, ignited immediately into a fireball that could not be subdued for several hours. One of the 61 survivors of the Pan Am flight said that sitting in the nose of the plane probably saved his life: "We all settled back, and the next thing an explosion took place and the whole port side, left side of the plane, was just torn wide open."

Captain Veldhuyzen van Zanten was KLM's chief of flight training and one of their most senior pilots. About two months before the accident, he had conducted the Boeing 747 qualification check on the co-pilot of Flight 4805. His photograph was used for publicity materials such as magazine advertisements, including the inflight magazine on board PH-BUF. KLM had suggested initially that Veldhuyzen van Zanten should help with the investigation, unaware that he was the captain who had been killed in the accident.

Victims 
Both airplanes were destroyed in the collision. All 248 passengers and crew aboard the KLM plane died, as did 335 passengers and crew aboard the Pan Am plane, primarily due to the fire and explosions resulting from the fuel spilled and ignited in the impact. The other 61 passengers and crew aboard the Pan Am aircraft survived. There were initially 70 survivors, but 9 passengers later died of their injuries. Among the survivors were the captain, first officer, and flight engineer. Most of the survivors on the Pan Am walked out onto the intact left wing, the side away from the collision, through holes in the fuselage structure. 

The Pan Am's engines were still running for a few minutes after the accident despite first officer Bragg's intention to turn them off. The top part of the cockpit, where the engine switches were located, had been destroyed in the collision, and all control lines were severed, leaving no means for the flight crew to control the aircraft's systems. Survivors waited for rescue, but it did not come promptly, as the firefighters were initially unaware that there were two aircraft involved and were concentrating on the KLM wreck hundreds of meters away in the thick fog and smoke. Eventually, most of the survivors on the wing dropped to the ground below.

Notable fatalities 
Eve Meyer, a pin-up model, film actress and producer and second wife of film director Russ Meyer, was on the Pan Am flight.
A. P. Hamann, the former city manager of San Jose, California, was on the Pan Am flight.

Aftermath 

The following day, the Canary Islands Independence Movement, responsible for the bombing at Gran Canaria that started the chain of events that led to the disaster, denied responsibility for the accident.

Los Rodeos Airport, the only operating airport on Tenerife in 1977, was closed to all fixed-wing traffic for two days. The first crash investigators to arrive at Tenerife the day after the crash travelled there by way of a 3-hour boat ride from Las Palmas. The first aircraft that was able to land was a U.S. Air Force C-130 transport, which landed on the airport's main taxiway at 12:50 on 29 March. The C-130 was arranged by Lt. Col Dr. James K. Slaton, who arrived before the crash investigators and started a triage of surviving passengers. Slaton was dispatched from Torrejon Air Base just outside of Madrid, Spain. Slaton, a flight surgeon attached to the 613th Tactical Fighter Squadron, worked with local medical staff and remained on scene until the last survivor was airlifted to awaiting medical facilities. The C-130 transported all surviving and injured passengers from Tenerife airport to Las Palmas; many of the injured were taken from there to other Air Force bases in the U.S. for further treatment.

Spanish Army soldiers were tasked with clearing crash wreckage from the runways and taxiways. By March 30, a small plane shuttle service was approved, but large jets still could not land. Los Rodeos was fully reopened on April 3rd, after wreckage had been fully removed and engineers had repaired the airport's runway.

Investigation 

The accident was investigated by Spain's Comisión de Investigación de Accidentes e Incidentes de Aviación Civil (CIAIAC). About 70 personnel were involved in the investigation, including representatives from the United States, the Netherlands and the two airline companies. Facts showed that there had been misinterpretations and false assumptions before the accident. Analysis of the CVR transcript showed that the KLM pilot thought that he had been cleared for takeoff, while the Tenerife control tower believed that the KLM 747 was stationary at the end of the runway, awaiting takeoff clearance. It appears that KLM's co-pilot was not as certain about take-off clearance as the captain.

Probable cause 
The investigation concluded that the fundamental cause of the accident was that Captain Veldhuyzen van Zanten attempted to take off without clearance. The investigators suggested the reason for this was a desire to leave as soon as possible in order to comply with KLM's duty-time regulations (which went in place earlier that year) and before the weather deteriorated further.

Other major factors contributing to the accident were:
 The sudden fog greatly limited visibility and the control tower and the crews of both planes were unable to see one another.
 Interference from simultaneous radio transmissions with the result that it was difficult to hear messages.

The following factors were considered contributing but not critical:
 The use of ambiguous non-standard phrases by the KLM co-pilot ("We're at take off") and the Tenerife control tower ("OK").
 The Pan Am aircraft did not leave the runway at the third intersection as instructed.
 The airport was forced to accommodate a great number of large aircraft due to rerouting from the terrorist incident resulting in disruption of the normal use of taxiways.

Dutch response 

The Dutch authorities were reluctant to accept the Spanish report blaming the KLM captain for the accident. The Netherlands Department of Civil Aviation published a response that, while accepting that the KLM captain had taken off "prematurely", argued that he alone should not be blamed for the "mutual misunderstanding" that occurred between the controller and the KLM crew, and that limitations of using radio as a means of communication should have been given greater consideration.

In particular, the Dutch response pointed out that:
 The crowded airport had placed additional pressure on all parties, including the KLM cockpit crew, the Pan Am cockpit crew, and the controller;
 Sounds on the CVR suggested that during the accident the Spanish control tower crew had been listening to a football match on the radio and may have been distracted;
 The transmission from the tower in which the controller passed KLM their ATC clearance was ambiguous and could have been interpreted as also giving take-off clearance. In support of this part of their response, the Dutch investigators pointed out that Pan Am's messages "No! Eh?" and "We are still taxiing down the runway, the Clipper 1736!" indicated that captain Grubbs and first officer Bragg had recognized the ambiguity (this message was not audible to the control tower or KLM crew due to simultaneous cross-communication);
 The Pan Am had taxied beyond the third exit. Had the plane turned at the third exit as instructed, the collision would not have occurred.

Although the Dutch authorities were initially reluctant to blame captain Veldhuyzen van Zanten and his crew, the airline ultimately accepted responsibility for the accident. KLM paid the victims' families compensation ranging between $58,000 and $600,000 (or $ to $ million today, adjusted for inflation). The sum of settlements for property and damages was $110 million (or $ million today), an average of $189,000 (or $ today) per victim, due to limitations imposed by European Compensation Conventions in effect at the time.

Speculations 
This was one of the first accident investigations to include a study into the contribution of "human factors". These included:
 Captain Veldhuyzen van Zanten, a KLM training captain and instructor for over 10-years working on simulators regularly, had not flown on regular routes during twelve weeks prior to the accident.
 The apparent hesitation of the flight engineer and the first officer to challenge Veldhuyzen van Zanten further. The official investigation suggested that this might have been due to not only to the captain's seniority in rank but also his being one of the most respected pilots working for the airline. (This view is questioned by Jan Bartelski, a former KLM captain and the president of the International Federation of Air Line Pilots' Associations (IFALPA), who knew both officers and believes this explanation to be inconsistent with his knowledge of their personalities. The first officer had intervened when Veldhuyzen van Zanten first opened the throttles, but had then failed to do so on the second occasion. Although the flight engineer had indeed asked the captain whether or not the Pan Am was clear of the runway, he seemed reassured by the captain's answer. The co-pilots had clearly challenged the captain's decisions, but were not insistent enough to convince him to abort the attempted takeoff).
 The flight engineer was the only member of the KLM's flight crew to react to the control tower's instruction to "report when runway clear"; this might have been due to his having completed his pre-flight checks, whereas his colleagues were experiencing an increased workload, just as the visibility worsened. 
 The ALPA study group concluded that the KLM crew did not realize that the transmission "Papa Alpha One Seven Three Six, report when runway clear" was directed at the Pan Am, because this was the first and only time the Pan Am was referred to by that name. Previously, the Pan Am had been called "Clipper One Seven Three Six", using its proper call-sign.

The extra fuel taken on by the KLM added several factors:
 Takeoff was delayed by an extra 35 minutes, allowing time for the fog to settle in;
 More than 45 tonnes of additional weight was added to the aircraft, increasing the takeoff distance and making it more difficult to clear the Pan Am when taking off;
 The increased severity of the fire caused by the additional fuel led ultimately to the deaths of all those on board.

Legacy 

As a consequence of the accident, sweeping changes were made to international airline regulations and to aircraft. Aviation authorities around the world introduced requirements for standard phrases and a greater emphasis on English as a common working language.

Air traffic instruction must not be acknowledged solely with a colloquial phrase such as "OK" or even "Roger" (which simply means the last transmission was received), but with a readback of the key parts of the instruction, to show mutual understanding. The word "takeoff" is now spoken only when the actual takeoff clearance is given, or when canceling that same clearance (i.e., "cleared for takeoff" or "cancel takeoff clearance"). Until that point, aircrew and controllers should use the word "departure" in its place (e.g., "ready for departure"). Additionally, an ATC clearance given to an aircraft already lined-up on the runway must be prefixed with the instruction "hold position".

Cockpit procedures were also changed after the accident. Hierarchical relations among crew members were played down, and greater emphasis was placed on team decision-making by mutual agreement. Less experienced flight crew members were encouraged to challenge their captains when they believed something to be incorrect, and captains were instructed to listen to their crew and evaluate all decisions in light of crew concerns. This course of action was later expanded into what is known today as crew resource management (CRM), which states that all pilots, no matter how experienced they are, are allowed to contradict each other. This was a problem in the crash when the Flight Engineer asked if they were not clear, but Jacob Veldhuyzen van Zanten (the captain of the KLM, with over 11,000 hours flown) said that they were obviously clear and the Flight Engineer decided that it was best not to contradict the captain. CRM training has been mandatory for all airline pilots since 2006.

In 1978, a second airport was opened on the island of Tenerife, the new Tenerife South Airport (TFS), which now serves the majority of international tourist flights. Los Rodeos, renamed Tenerife North Airport (TFN), was then used only for domestic and inter-island flights until 2002, when a new terminal was opened and Tenerife North began to carry international traffic again.

The Spanish government installed a ground radar system at Tenerife North Airport following the accident.

Memorials 

A Dutch national memorial and final resting place for the victims of the KLM plane is located in Amsterdam, at Westgaarde cemetery. There is also a memorial at the Westminster Memorial Park and Mortuary in Westminster, California, US.

In 1977, a cross in Rancho Bernardo was dedicated to nineteen area residents who died in the disaster.

In 2007, the 30th anniversary marked the first time that Dutch and American next-of-kin and aid helpers from Tenerife joined an international commemoration service, held at the Auditorio de Tenerife in Santa Cruz. The International Tenerife Memorial March 27, 1977, was inaugurated at the Mesa Mota on March 27, 2007. The monument was designed by Dutch sculptor Rudi van de Wint (1942-2006).

Documentaries 
The disaster has been featured in many TV shows and documentaries. These include
 Episode 1 of Survival in the Sky, "Blaming the Pilot" (1996)
 Episode 12 of Seconds From Disaster, "Collision on the Runway" (2004)
 Episode 625 of PBS's NOVA, "The Deadliest Plane Crash" (2006)
 The PBS special Surviving Disaster: How the Brain Works Under Extreme Duress (2011), which was based on Amanda Ripley's book The Unthinkable: Who Survives When Disaster Strikes - and Why
 An episode of Destroyed in Seconds
 Episode 133 (S16E03) of the Canadian TV series Mayday (known by different names in different countries), "Disaster at Tenerife" (2016), as well as the earlier in-depth 90-minute special "Crash of the Century" (2005).
 Footage of the wreckages was included in the 1979 film Days of Fury, narrated by Vincent Price.

See also 
 List of accidents and incidents involving commercial aircraft

References 

 Collision on Tenerife: The How and Why of the World's Worst Aviation Disaster by Jon Ziomek (Post Hill Press, 2018).

External links 

Official Spanish and Dutch accident reports  
 English translation of Spanish report and Dutch response
 "A-102/1977 y A-103/1977 Accidente Ocurrido el 27 de Marzo de 1977 a las Aeronaves Boeing 747, Matrícula PH-BUF de K.L.M. y Aeronave Boeing 747, matrícula N736PA de PANAM en el Aeropuerto de los Rodeos, Tenerife (Islas Canarias)." – Hosted by the Civil Aviation Accident and Incident Investigation Commission 
Human Factors Report on the Tenerife Accident – Air Line Pilots Association of the United States (Archive)
Project Tenerife – website about the Tenerife disaster
Watch Days of Fury at the Internet Archive

Accidents and incidents involving the Boeing 747
Airliner accidents and incidents involving ground collisions
Airliner accidents and incidents caused by pilot error
Airliner accidents and incidents involving fog
Aviation accidents and incidents in 1977
Aviation accidents and incidents in Spain
KLM accidents and incidents
Pan Am accidents and incidents
Disaster
1977 in the Netherlands
1977 in Spain
Netherlands–Spain relations
Netherlands–United States relations
Spain–United States relations
March 1977 events in Europe
History of the Canary Islands